National Route 6 (officially, Ruta Nacional Número 6 "Dr. Juan León Mallorquín", better known as Ruta Seis) is one of the national highways of Paraguay. With a length of 247 km it mainly connects the second and third most populated cities in Paraguay, Ciudad del Este and Encarnación respectively. It crosses the departments of Alto Parana and Itapua.

Distances and important cities

The following table shows the distances traversed by National Route 6 in each different department, and important cities that it passes by (or near).

6
Alto Paraná Department
Itapúa Department